Shangchuan Island (also known as "Schangschwan", "Sancian", "Sanchão", "Chang-Chuang", "St. John's Island" or "St John Island") is the main island of Chuanshan Archipelago on the southern coast of Guangdong, China. Its name originated from São João ("Saint John" in Portuguese).

Administratively, it is a part of Chuandao, Taishan. Located  from the mainland, it became the largest island in Guangdong after Hainan Island was carved out of the province in 1988.

It is known for having been the place of death of St. Francis Xavier. Nowadays, it is a tourist site in Guangdong.

History

Shangchuan Island was one of the first bases established by the Portuguese off the China coast, during the 16th century. They abandoned this base after the Chinese government gave consent for a permanent and official Portuguese trade base at Macau in 1557.

The Spanish (Navarre) Jesuit missionary St. Francis Xavier died on the island on December 3, 1552, as he was waiting for a ship to take him to mainland China.
There is a small chapel that commemorates his death place, designed by Achille-Antoine Hermitte and completed in 1869.

Geography

The island has been isolated from the mainland since the last ice age. It is located near Xiachuan Island, which lies west of Shangchuan. The two islands, together with smaller islets, form Chuanshan Archipelago.

Shangshuan Island has an area of 137.3 km2 and a 217 km coastline.

Settlements on the island include:
 Dalangwan
 Shadi, a fishing port on the southwestern coast

Climate

Economy

Shangchuan and Xiachuan have been established as a Tourism Open Integrated Experimental Zone (旅游开发综合试验区, pinyin: lǚyóu kāifā zōnghé shìyàn qū).

Feisha Beach Resort is a commercial tourist resort located on the island's eastern shore.

Transportation

Shangchuan Island is linked by ferry to Guanghai, Haiyan (Shanju) and Xiachuan Island.

See also

 Chuanshan Archipelago
 Tamão, Lampacau, Shuangyu
 List of islands of the People's Republic of China
 List of islands in the South China Sea
 List of Jesuit sites

Notes and references

Further reading

External links

General
 
 Satellite view on Google Maps
 Website about Shangchuan 
 Shangchuan on taishan.com 
 on tsinfo.com.cn 
 Pictures of the island (click on the links on the left to view more)

Maps
 Old map

Francis Xavier Chapel
 Picture of Shangchuan island. The chapel marks the location of Francis Xavier's death
 Another picture of the chapel
 Satellite view of the chapel

Taishan, Guangdong
Islands of Guangdong
Islands of the South China Sea
Populated places in China
Islands of China